Saudi Arabia competed at the 2014 Summer Youth Olympics, in Nanjing, China from 16 August to 28 August 2014.

Athletics

Saudi Arabia qualified two athletes.

Qualification Legend: Q=Final A (medal); qB=Final B (non-medal); qC=Final C (non-medal); qD=Final D (non-medal); qE=Final E (non-medal)

Boys
Track & road events

Field Events

Equestrian

Saudi Arabia qualified a rider.

Taekwondo

Saudi Arabia was given a wild card to compete.

Boys

Weightlifting

Saudi Arabia was given a reallocation spot to compete.

Boys

References

2014 in Saudi Arabian sport
Nations at the 2014 Summer Youth Olympics
Saudi Arabia at the Youth Olympics